Adorjan is a village in Serbia. It is located in the Kanjiža municipality, in the North Banat District, Vojvodina province. The village has a Hungarian ethnic majority (74.91%) and a population of 1,128 (2002 census).

See also
List of places in Serbia
List of cities, towns and villages in Vojvodina
Adorján, the Hungarian equivalent of Adrian, which is also a surname.

External links
 History of Adorjan 

Places in Bačka